A bloomy rind is a cheese rind that is soft and fluffy and white in color. Cheese that uses Penicillium camemberti is prone to developing bloomy rind. Bloomy rind cheese can be described as having "mild and lactic" flavors that may resemble onion or mushroom. They are described as being "ripened from the outside," and usually have creamy textures.

Brie cheese is a type of cheese prone to bloomy rind.

See also
 Types of cheese

References

Characteristics of cheese